KVYN (99.3 MHz) is a commercial FM radio station licensed to Saint Helena, California, and serving the Napa Valley and Wine Country of Northern California.  The station broadcasts an adult album alternative (AAA) radio format and is owned by licensee Wine Down Media LLC.  The radio studios and offices are located at 135 Gasser Drive, Suite D in Napa, California.

KVYN has an effective radiated power (ERP) of 6,000 watts.  The transmitter is off Silverado Trail in Yountville, California.

History

The station was founded by Thomas L. Young and initially signed on the air in 1975.

In May 2017 an announcement was made that the station along with sister station KVON had been sold by Wine Country Broadcasting to Wine Down Media. The transaction was consummated on August 1, 2017.

Translator Station
The station is also heard in Calistoga, California, through an FM translator at 103.5 MHz.

References

External links
KVYN's official website

Adult album alternative radio stations in the United States
St. Helena, California
VYN
Radio stations established in 1975
1975 establishments in California